Aframomum cereum is a monocotyledonous plant species in the family Zingiberaceae that was first described by Joseph Dalton Hooker, and got its current name from Karl Moritz Schumann.

References 

cereum